Michael Sloane is an actor and writer.

Michael Sloane may also refer to:

Michael Sloane, character in Frankenstein (2004 film)
Mick Sloane, character in ReGenesis